The  Orlando Predators season was the twenty-fourth season for the franchise in the Arena Football League. The team was coached by Rob Keefe and played their home games at the Amway Center. The Predators improved to a 12-6 record and won the South division for the second straight year.

Standings

Schedule

Regular season
The 2015 regular season schedule was released on December 19, 2014.

Playoffs

Roster

References

Orlando Predators
Orlando Predators seasons
Orlando Predators
2010s in Orlando, Florida